Saint Louis Station or former name Suksa Witthaya Station is an infill BTS Skytrain station, on the Silom Line in Bangkok, Thailand. The name Saint Louis is of the neighbourhood surrounding the Saint Louis Catholic Church and the affiliated Saint Louis Hospital on the Sathon Tai Road.

It is a station on the Silom Line between Chong Nonsi and Surasak, and opened on 8 February 2021.

In 2018, it was decided to finally build the missing Suksa Witthaya (S4) station, the environment impact assessment was finalized in March 2019. Construction of the station began in August 2019 and by the end of 2019 had reached 25% progress. By August 2020, construction had reached 50% but was 30% behind schedule due to COVID related delays. The station opened on 8 February 2021.

References

External links
 Area Map of Saint Louis Station (S4) - BTS Skytrain Official Website

BTS Skytrain stations
Railway stations opened in 2021